Immunoglobulin lambda like polypeptide 5 is a protein that in humans is encoded by the IGLL5 gene.

Function

This gene encodes one of the immunoglobulin lambda-like polypeptides. It is located within the immunoglobulin lambda locus but it does not require somatic rearrangement for expression. The first exon of this gene is unrelated to immunoglobulin variable genes; the second and third exons are the immunoglobulin lambda joining 1 and the immunoglobulin lambda constant 1 gene segments. Alternative splicing results in multiple transcript variants. [provided by RefSeq, May 2010].

References

Further reading